Daniel Ljungkvist (born September 18, 1981) is a Swedish professional ice hockey player currently with the IK Oskarshamn team in the Swedish second league.

References

External links 

1981 births
Living people
IK Oskarshamn players
People from Vetlanda Municipality
Swedish ice hockey defencemen
Södertälje SK players
HV71 players
Sportspeople from Jönköping County